is a Japanese web designer. Yugo studied engineering, architecture and landscape design. He is one of the authors of New Masters Of Flash (2003). Yugo has exhibited and lectured in Asia, United States, and Europe. His artwork has been shown at Centre Pompidou in Paris, Vienna Künstlerhaus in Vienna, and the Design Museum in London. His commercial works have received many international awards, including Cannes Lions, One Show, Clio Award, and NY ADC. He utilizes mathematics underlying natural complexity to create online interactions that are usable and familiar because their behavior is modeled on the natural world.

Nakamura is owner of the web development company Tha Ltd. FFFFOUND!, a popular image bookmarking site, was launched by the company in 2007 and was closed on May 8, 2017.

Books and publications
2004 	Creative Code / John Maeda - Thames & Hudson
2003 	+81(Vol.24) - +81
2003 	Sugo - Sugo
2003 	JPG - Actar Editorial
2003 	TIME Magazine - TIME
2002 	SPOON  - Phaidon
2001 	72 DPI - Die Gestalten Verlag
2001 	New Master of Flash 2 - friends of ED
2001 	Gasbook 10 - DesignExchange
2001 	WDA 2001 - GRAPHIC
2000 	Moving Type - Digital Media Design
2000 	New Master of Flash - friends of ED
2000 	Gasbook 8 - DesignExchange
2000 	Big 26 : Tradition - Big Magazine

Awards 
 2007 	Tokyo Interactive Ad Awards - Gold - UNIQLO USA
 2007 	Cannes Cyber Lion - Silver - UNIQLO USA
 2007 	OneShow - Silver - UNIQLO USA
 2006 	Cannes Cyber Lion - Gold - Communication Evolved
 2006 	Tokyo Interactive Ad Awards - Gold - Communication Evolved
 2006 	OneShow - Silver - Communication Evolved
 2006 	Clio Awards - Bronze - Communication Evolved
 2006 	Cannes Cyber Lion - Silver - Honda Sweet Mission
 2006 	Tokyo Interactive Ad Awards - Silver - Honda Sweet Mission
 2005 	Prix Ars Electronica - Distinctive Merit - yugop.com
 2005 	Cannes Cyber Lion - Gold - FM Festival 2004
 2005 	Tokyo Interactive Ad Awards - Gold - FM Festival 2004
 2005 	NY ADC 	Distinctive Merit - FM Festival 2004
 2005 	Clio Awards - Silver - FM Festival 2004
 2005 	One Show Interactive - Silver - FM Festival 2004
 2004 	Cannes Cyber Lion - Grand Prix - ecotonoha
 2004 	One Show Interactive - Best of Show - ecotonoha
 2004 	One Show Interactive - Grand Clio - ecotonoha
 2004 	LIAA - Grand Prix - ecotonoha
 2004 	Clio Awards - Gold - ecotonoha
 2004 	Clio Awards - Gold - ecotonoha
 2004 	Tokyo Interactive Ad Awards - Silver - ecotonoha
 2004 	ACA Media Arts Festival - Short List - ecotonoha
 2004 	Tokyo Interactive Ad Awards - Grand Prix - TRUNK
 2003 	Tokyo Interactive Ad Awards - Grand Prix - CAMCAMTIME
 2003 	One Show Interactive - Gold - CAMCAMTIME
 2003 	NY ADC 	Distinctive Merit - CAMCAMTIME
 2003 	ACA Media Arts Festival - Excellence Prize - CAMCAMTIME
 2002 	LIAA - Short List - Connected_Identity
 2002 	ACA Media Arts Festival - Excellence Prize - Sky Pavilion
 2001 	Cannes Lions - Short List - Sky Pavilion
 2001 	WDA 2001 - Special Prize - Connected_Identity

References

External links
  Tha - Web Design Agency run by Yugo Nakamura

1970 births
Living people
Software engineers
Flash artists
Japanese graphic designers
Japanese computer scientists